Abdülhak Şinasi Hisar (March 14, 1887 in Istanbul – May 3, 1963 in Istanbul) was a Turkish writer.

He spent his childhood in Rumeli Hisarı and studied at the Galatasaray High School and later political sciences in Paris. Back to Ottoman Empire, he worked for a French company and later for Stines Mining Company and Regie des Tabacs. He also contributed several publications, including Yedigün.

Works
 Fahim Bey ve Biz (1941)
 Çamlıca’daki Eniştemiz (1944) 
 Ali Nizami Bey’in Alafrangalığı ve Şeyhliği (1952)
 Boğaziçi Mehtapları (1942) 
 Boğaziçi Yalıları (1954) 
 Geçmiş Zaman Köşkleri (1956)
 Geçmiş Zaman Fıkraları (1958)
 Antoloji: Aşk imiş ..... (1955)
 İstanbul ve Pierre Loti (1958)
 Yahya Kemal’e Veda (1959)
 Ahmet Haşim : Şiiri ve Hayatı (1963)

Biographies and information
 Orhan Pamuk – İstanbul – Hatıralar ve Şehir, 2003
 Louis Mitler - Contemporary Turkish Writers, Indiana University, Bloomington, 1988
 Necmettin Turinay: Abdülhak Şinasi Hisar, 1988

References

1887 births
1963 deaths
Writers from Istanbul